Dinotopia is a series of illustrated fantasy books, created by author and illustrator James Gurney. It is set in the titular Dinotopia, an isolated island inhabited by shipwrecked humans and sapient dinosaurs who have learned to coexist peacefully as a single symbiotic society. The first book was published in 1992 and has "appeared in 18 languages in more than 30 countries and sold two million copies." Dinotopia: A Land Apart from Time and Dinotopia: The World Beneath both won Hugo awards for best original artwork.

Since its original publication, over twenty Dinotopia books have been published by various authors to expand the series.

A live-action television miniseries, a short-lived live-action TV series, a 2005 animated film, and several video games have also been released.

Background
Gurney's assignments for National Geographic required him to work with archaeologists to envision and paint ancient cities that no one alive today has ever seen. This inspired him to imagine his own, so he painted "Waterfall City" and "Dinosaur parade". These were originally done as art prints for collectors. He later decided to create an imaginary island based on these paintings.

Rather than digital tools, Gurney used "plein-air studies, thumbnail sketches, models photographed in costume and original cardboard or clay maquettes" to create 150 oil paintings for his 2007 Dinotopia book. He called the series "Dinotopia": a portmanteau of "dinosaur" and "utopia".

Series overview
Dinotopia began as an illustrated children's book called Dinotopia: A Land Apart from Time. It was a cross-over success, appealing to both children and adult readers, which led James Gurney to write and illustrate three more books called Dinotopia: The World Beneath, Dinotopia: First Flight and Dinotopia: Journey to Chandara. They all deal with the adventures of Arthur and Will Denison to one degree or another. These are considered the main books of the series and establish the fictional world in which the others are set. Gurney keeps abreast with recent paleontological discoveries and has written then-newly discovered dinosaurs into his books, for example, including Giganotosaurus in The World Beneath and Microraptor in Journey to Chandara

A children's flip-up version of the first book was also issued.  The Dinotopia Digest series consists of sixteen young adult novels penned by several different authors. These books feature other characters who are not specifically involved with the events of the main books, although characters from the main books (particularly the Denisons) have appeared in minor or cameo roles. Two full-length adult fantasy novels were also issued with Gurney's authority, written by Alan Dean Foster: Dinotopia Lost and The Hand of Dinotopia.

Several video games, as well as a TV miniseries, a short-lived TV series, and an animated children's movie, were also produced. These are also set in the Dinotopia universe, but do not tie in directly with the main series. Most of them take place in the modern world, unlike the books, which are mostly set in the mid-19th century.

Main characters 
 Arthur Denison – An American scientist and the main protagonist of the books. Following the death of his wife Rachel in 1860 he and his son Will left their home Boston on a voyage of discovery. Then in 1862 they were both washed up on the island of Dinotopia after being shipwrecked.
 Will Denison – The son of Arthur Denison and the second main protagonist of the books. During his time on the island he met and fell in love with local Dinotopian girl, Sylvia Romano and eventually trained to be a Skybax Rider and was partnered with a Skybax named Cirrus. 
 Bix – A Protoceratops multilingual who is an ambassador and the good friend and traveling partner of Arthur Denison, having accompanied him to the World Beneath and Chandara. 
 Sylvia Romano – A Dinotopian girl who lives in the Hatchery with her parents Giorgio and Maria. Eventually she became a Skybax Rider with Will and was partnered with a Skybax named Nimbus.
 Lee Crabb – The main antagonist of the books. He was washed up on Dinotopia in 1853, however Crabb despised the island and ever since had being plotting a means of escape. 
 Oriana Nascava – A musician who lives in Waterfall City who accompanied Arthur during his return trip to the World Beneath. At the end of the book she and Arthur are implied to have become romantically linked.
 Nallab – The assistant librarian of the library of Waterfall City. 
 Brokenhorn – A well respected Triceratops elder who is the son of the famous Greyback the Wise. 
 Oolu – Oolu is the chief Skybax instructor at Sky City, where he trains Skybax Riders. 
 Gideon Altaire – The main protagonist of the third Dinotopian book, The First Flight. He lived on the island of Poseidos during the Age of Heroes.

Main books
The plot of the main Dinotopia books concerns Arthur Denison and his son, Will, and the various people they meet in their travels in Dinotopia. In the fashion of authors such as Edgar Rice Burroughs, the first and fourth books are written as if they were Arthur's journals, with Gurney going so far as to explain in the introductions how he happened to come across the old, waterlogged volumes.

A Land Apart from Time
In Dinotopia: A Land Apart from Time (1992), the Denisons are shipwrecked near Dinotopia and, after making it ashore, are found by the people of the Hatchery. The Hatchery is a place where dinosaurs are born, tended by both dinosaurs and humans. The Denisons then set out to explore the island, hoping to find a means of returning to their old lives.

Arthur and Will undergo a broad journey, circling the island, as they endeavor to learn the customs and culture of their new neighbors. Arthur in particular develops an interest in the scientific accomplishments of the natives, which far exceed that of any human culture. Among the subjects he studies are the flora of the island, the partnership of its inhabitants, and the existence of a place known as the World Beneath. This World Beneath is an explanation for Dinotopians surviving the saurian extinction; according to the story, most of the Earth's dinosaurs were destroyed, whilst a few hid in vast caverns. These few became the original Dinotopians. No one has entered the World Beneath for centuries, but Arthur intends to do so.

His son Will, on the other hand, has chosen to train as a messenger of the sky; a Skybax rider, who lives in symbiosis with his mount, the great Quetzalcoatlus (nicknamed Skybax), a species of pterosaur. Training alongside Will is a girl called Sylvia, with whom Will falls in love.  Arthur, for his part, travels into the World Beneath, at the same time that Will and Sylvia are learning to fly with the Skybax. When he returns, he is fascinated by the ancient relics found there and is convinced that they may be key in enabling him to leave or explore the island. Will is at the time too young to marry Sylvia, but it is promised that they will. Arthur recognizes that his son has grown up, and they each accept the changes that are results of their new lives on the island.

The World Beneath

The first sequel, Dinotopia: The World Beneath (1995) focuses mainly on Arthur Denison's return expedition to the World Beneath and opens with Will fly testing an invention of his father, the Dragoncopter – a steam engine ornithopter modeled on the dragonfly. The Dragoncopter fails and Will is narrowly saved by Cirrus, his Skybax mount, before the Dragoncopter plummets into a waterfall.

After returning from his first expedition in A Land Apart From Time, Arthur presents two items he discovered – a sunstone and half of a key – to the council at Waterfall City in an attempt to get a second expedition into the World Beneath.

First Flight

Dinotopia: First Flight (1999) was a prequel published by Gurney and included a board game.

The main protagonist of the story is Gideon Altaire, a flight school student living in the capital city of Poseidos off the Dinotopian mainland, in which all organic life (save for humans) has been replaced by mechanical counterparts. After discovering an injured Scaphognathus named Razzamult, Gideon discovers that the city is planning to launch an attack on the mainland and conquer all of Dinotopia and that they have stolen the ruby sunstone from the pterosaur home of Highnest. Gideon is presented as the first ever Skybax rider, although the species he rode wasn't a Quetzalcoatlus northropi.

Journey to Chandara

A fourth Dinotopia book by James Gurney, Dinotopia: Journey to Chandara, was published in October 2007. In it, Hugo Khan, the mysterious and reclusive emperor of Chandara, an empire long since isolated from the rest of Dinotopia, has heard of Arthur Denison and Bix's exploits and sends them a personal invitation to his court.

Other books in the series
From 1995, James Gurney worked with a number of other authors on a series of short novels for children using the Dinotopia characters and themes, published by Random House:

 Windchaser by Scott Ciencin
 River Quest by John Vornholt
 Hatchling by Midori Snyder
 Lost City by Scott Ciencin
 Sabertooth Mountain by John Vornholt
 Thunder Falls by Scott Ciencin
 Firestorm by Gene De Weese
 The Maze by Peter David 
 Rescue Party by Mark A. Garland
 Sky Dance by Scott Ciencin
 Chomper by Don Glut
 Return to Lost City by Scott Ciencin
 Survive! by Brad Strickland
 The Explorers by Scott Ciencin
 Dolphin Watch by John Vornholt
 Oasis by Cathy Hapka
Dinotopia Lost by Alan Dean Foster
The Hand of Dinotopia by Alan Dean Foster

TV miniseries

A 2002 four-hour TV miniseries produced by Hallmark Entertainment was also based on James Gurney's work, and was advertised as the first "mega-series" (3-night series). The show featured new characters such as Zippo (changed to Zippeau for the TV series to avoid legal issues with the lighter maker Zippo), a Stenonychosaurus who is said to have worked with Sylvia; the sunstones, a technology restricted to the lost city of Poseidos in the books, are commonplace in the miniseries.  The failure both of the sunstones and of Dinotopian officials to adhere to the underlying meanings of their culture's philosophy caused several discontented people – a leader-in-training, Zippeau himself, and two twentieth-century Dolphinbacks, Karl and David – to embark on a quest that led ultimately to the World Beneath. The series is presented as a sequel of sorts to the books: Will Denison's daughter followed her father into the Skybax corps (an order acknowledged to be founded by Gideon Altaire), Oriana's granddaughter is the female protagonist, the character Zippo is said to have been the dinosaur partner of Sylvia (here the Nursery overseer and not a Skybax rider), and Lee Crabb's son Cyrus features as the antagonist.

TV series

A TV series of thirteen episodes was produced later in 2002 as a result of the success of the miniseries, but none of the cast of the miniseries reprised their roles. In the later TV series, a group of people known as Outsiders live outside the laws of Dinotopia and pose an additional danger aside from the featured antagonists, which include Pteranodon, Tyrannosaurus, and Postosuchus.

ABC originally planned to launch the series in September 2002, but decided to wait until Thanksgiving. ABC was somewhat disappointed by the initial 5.7 million viewers and the poor ratings, but continued to air the series for a little while longer, pointing out that it had been an "odd viewing night overall." The series was finally canceled in December. Only six of the thirteen episodes were aired on ABC, but all thirteen were broadcast the following year in Europe and were released onto a three-disc DVD box set.

Science-fiction veteran David Winning directed two episodes of the series, and location shooting lasted for three months near Budapest, Hungary. Georgina Rylance played Marion Waldo, and Lisa Zane portrayed her old friend LeSage, the leader of the Outsiders. Michael Brandon, Jonathan Hyde, and Erik von Detten also star in the series. The series ended with a cliffhanger.

DVD releases
Artisan Entertainment released the complete series on DVD in Region 1 for the first time on 20 January 2004.  This release has been discontinued and is out of print. On 15 March 2016, Mill Creek Entertainment re-released the complete series on DVD in Region 1.

Other media

Film
There is also a 2005 traditionally animated movie called Dinotopia: Quest for the Ruby Sunstone. This film deviated from the original books even more than the miniseries by featuring Ogthar, a mythical ruler of the World Beneath (mentioned in the miniseries), as a human warlord rather than a benevolent, if commanding, emperor. It featured an all-star cast, including Alyssa Milano as 26, Malcolm McDowell as Ogthar, Jamie Kennedy as Spazz, Michael Clarke Duncan as Stink-tooth, Kathy Griffin as Rhoga, Wayne Knight as Thudd, George Segal as Albagon, Diedrich Bader as John, Tara Strong as Mara, and Alec Medlock as Kex Bradley. It was also the first and only acting role of hip-hop artist Rollin Woodford (Ro Morikawa).

Many have claimed that some scenes in the film Star Wars: Episode I – The Phantom Menace (particularly those in the city of Theed on Naboo) unfairly copy images from Gurney's books. Gurney acknowledges the resemblance but has remained positive about it. In 1994, director George Lucas had met with producers to discuss some of the concepts and visuals behind a Dinotopia movie that was never made.

Video games
A number of Dinotopia video games have been produced:
Dinotopia (PC: 1995)
Dinotopia Game Land Activity Center (PC/Mac: 2002)
Dinotopia: The Timestone Pirates (Game Boy Advance: 2002)
Dinotopia: The Sunstone Odyssey (GameCube/Xbox: 2003)

References

External links
 Dinotopia official website
 James Gurney's blog
 Dinotopia Journey to Chandara publisher's website

 
American Broadcasting Company original programming
Children's novels about dinosaurs
Novels about dinosaurs
Fictional countries
Utopian fiction
Fictional islands
American novels adapted into television shows
Novels adapted into video games
Fictional island countries
American fantasy novel series
Fantasy novel series
Lost world novels
American fantasy novels adapted into films